Hooke's atom, also known as harmonium or hookium, refers to an artificial helium-like atom where the Coulombic electron-nucleus interaction potential is 
replaced by a harmonic potential. This system is of significance as it is, for certain values of the force constant defining the harmonic containment, an exactly solvable ground-state many-electron problem that explicitly includes electron correlation. As such it can provide insight into quantum correlation (albeit in the presence of a non-physical nuclear potential) and can act as a test system for judging the accuracy of approximate quantum chemical methods for solving the Schrödinger equation.  The name "Hooke's atom" arises because the harmonic potential used to describe the electron-nucleus interaction is a consequence of Hooke's law.

Definition

Employing atomic units, the Hamiltonian defining the Hooke's atom is

As written, the first two terms are the kinetic energy operators of the two electrons, the third term is the harmonic electron-nucleus potential, and the final term the electron-electron interaction potential. The non-relativistic Hamiltonian of the helium atom differs only in the replacement:

Solution

The equation to be solved is the two electron Schrödinger equation:

For arbitrary values of the force constant, the Schrödinger equation does not have an analytic solution. Given the artificial nature of the system this restriction does not hinder the usefulness of the solution.

To solve, the system is first transformed from the Cartesian electronic coordinates, to the center of mass coordinates, defined as

Under this transformation, the Hamiltonian becomes separable – that is, the  term coupling the two electrons is removed (and not replaced by some other form) allowing the general separation of variables technique to be applied to further a solution for the wave function in the form . The original Schrödinger equation is then replaced by:

Decomposing  and expressing the Laplacian in spherical coordinates,

The asymptotic behavior  encourages a solution of the form

This equation lends itself to a solution by way of the Frobenius method. That is,   is expressed as

Terminating the polynomial at any particular order can be accomplished with different values of  defining the Hamiltonian. As such there exists an infinite number of systems, differing only in the strength of the harmonic containment, with exact ground-state solutions.

These directly force  and  respectively, and as a consequence of the three term recession, all higher coefficients also vanish.

and the radial wave function

Transforming back to 

Combining, normalizing, and transforming back to the original coordinates yields the ground state wave function:

The corresponding ground-state total energy is then .

Remarks

The exact ground state electronic density of the Hooke atom for the special case  is

From this we see that the radial derivative of the density vanishes at the nucleus. This is in stark contrast to the real (non-relativistic) helium atom where the density displays a cusp at the nucleus as a result of the unbounded Coulomb potential.

See also

List of quantum-mechanical systems with analytical solutions

References

Further reading 
 
 

Quantum chemistry
Quantum models